Mohamed Al-Kaabi may refer to:
 Mohamed Faraj Al-Kaabi (born 1984), Qatari hammer thrower
 Mohamed Al-Kaabi (windsurfer) (born 1957), Qatari windsurfer